Laszlo Berkowits (February 29, 1928 – December 13, 2020) was a Hungarian-born American Reform rabbi.

From 1944 to 1945, he was imprisoned in a Nazi concentration camp at Auschwitz. After his release in 1945, he studied briefly in Sweden before he moved to the United States, where he began studying to be a rabbi. He was ordained in 1963.

In 1963, he was hired by Temple Rodef Shalom as its first senior rabbi. He held this title for 35 years, prior to his retirement in July, 1998. In 1988, he received his Doctor of Divinity from Hebrew Union College-Jewish Institute of Religion. He served as Rabbi Emeritus at Temple Rodef Shalom  until his death on December 13, 2020 at age 92.

References

External links 
 Washington Post interview with Laszlo Berkowits

1928 births
2020 deaths
Hungarian emigrants to the United States
American Reform rabbis
Hungarian rabbis
Auschwitz concentration camp survivors
American people of Hungarian-Jewish descent
Hebrew Union College – Jewish Institute of Religion alumni
21st-century American Jews